VTB United League Promo-Cup 2008 was the first test run tournament of the VTB United League. The tournament was held during the 2008–09 basketball season on 20–22 December 2008, at the CSKA Universal Sports Hall in Moscow. The tournament included 8 teams from Russia, Latvia, Lithuania, Poland and Ukraine.

CSKA Moscow won the tournament by defeating Khimki Moscow Region in the final. Kyiv finished in third place by defeating Dynamo Moscow.

Promo-Cup 2008 clubs

Quarterfinals

5th-8th place

Awards

Final standings

All-Tournament Team 
 J.R. Holden (CSKA Moscow)
 Anton Ponkrashov (Khimki Moscow Region)
 Manu Markoishvili (Kyiv)
 Kenan Bajramović (Kyiv)
 Mike Wilkinson (Khimki Moscow Region)

External links 
 Official Website 
 Official Website 

2008
2008–09 in European basketball
2008–09 in Russian basketball
2008–09 in Lithuanian basketball
2008–09 in Ukrainian basketball
2008–09 in Latvian basketball
2008–09 in Polish basketball